Pectenocypris balaena is a fish species in the genus Pectenocypris from Borneo.

References

Pectenocypris
Fish described in 1989